Lauren Brincat (born 1980) is an Australian contemporary artist.

She works with multiple mediums including sculpture installations, moving image, and performance. Collaboration with other artists and cross disciplinary practice is a notable feature of her artistic approach. Her installations often encourage audience interaction.

Brincat's works are held in the multiple institutions including the Art Gallery of NSW, Museum of Contemporary Art Australia, and the Art Gallery of Western Australia. Brincat's work Salt lines: play it as it sounds was installed at the Carriageworks Arts Centre as part of the 2016 Sydney Bienalle. In 2019 she was co-commissioned by the MCA and Landcom as part of the C3West program to create a living sculpture work titled The Plant Library.

Brincat graduated from Sydney College of the Arts in 2006 with a Masters of Visual Arts.

Notable works

Solo works 
Hear This, Museum of Contemporary Art, Australia, 2011.

Shine on you crazy diamond, Museum of Old and New Art, Festival of Modern Art, Hobart, 2010 & Next Wave Federation Square Festival, Melbourne, 2010.

Salt Lines: play it as it sounds, Sydney Biennale. Purchased by the Art Gallery of New South Wales, 2015–16.

Walk the Line (companion piece to Salt Lines), Art Gallery of NSW, 2016.

The Plant Library, Museum of Contemporary Art Sydney, 2019.

Collaborative works and group shows 
Embodied Acts: Live and Alive (part of) Contemporary Australia: Women, Queensland Art Gallery and Gallery of Modern Art, Brisbane, 2012.

The Space Between Us: Anne Landa Award, Art Gallery of NSW, 2013

Sonic Social, Museum of Contemporary Art Australia, 2014.

Other Tempo: Liveworks, Carriageworks, 2019.

List of awards 
Australia Council for the Arts Emerging Artists Creative Australia Fellowship grant, 2012–14.
Woolarah Small Sculpture prize finalist, 2017 & 2018.

References 

1980 births
Living people
Australian contemporary artists
Australian video artists
Australian sound artists
Women sound artists
Australian women artists
Australian sculptors